Pterolophia quadrifasciata is a species of beetle in the family Cerambycidae. It was described by Charles Joseph Gahan in 1894. It is known from Myanmar and Malaysia.

References

quadrifasciata
Beetles described in 1894
Insects of Myanmar
Insects of Malaysia
Beetles of Asia